E.O.S.: Earth Orbit Stations is a space station construction and management simulation game developed by Karl Buiter for Electronic Arts. It was released for the Commodore 64 and Apple II in 1987.

Gameplay

The game focuses on both the material and economic challenges of building a permanent, fully functioning space station in geocentric orbit.

The game was set in 1996, and the player is given various selected scenarios to fulfill, from mundane tasks such as setting up a simple space station to developing and supplying a specified amount of high-grade, zero G pharmaceuticals to being the first to contact alien life. The game also is a cutthroat strategy game in multiplayer, as players compete over finite resources and resource management.

Reception
Computer Gaming World in 1987 gave the game a mixed review. While the single-player portion was praised, the review felt the game had too high a learning curve to be really suitable for multiplayer. The user interface was particularly bothersome, described as "a textbook case of how not to design a window/menu/graphics interface." The documentation was similarly described as poorly organized and cryptic. In 1992 and 1994 surveys of science fiction games the magazine gave the title two-plus stars of five, calling it "An interesting failure ... the logistics just are not that much fun". Compute! reviewed the game more favorably, stating that "EOS offers a level of challenge unusual in space-related software. To succeed at this game requires careful thought".

Reviews
 Casus Belli #43 (Feb 1988)

See also
Project: Space Station

References

External links
 
 Mozomedia Apple II retrospective

1987 video games
Commodore 64 games
Apple II games
Business simulation games
Video games developed in the United States
Video games set in 1996